Charles Louis Pierre Marion (14 January 1887 – 16 November 1944) was a French  assassinated politician and general. He was also a horse rider who competed in the 1928 Summer Olympics and in the 1932 Summer Olympics.

Horse riding 
In 1928 he and his horse Linon won the silver medal in the individual dressage competition. Four years later he and his horse Linon won the silver medal in the individual dressage competition again. They were also part of the French dressage team which won the gold medal in the team dressage event.

Government career 
Charles Marion served as a general and a prefect for the government of Vichy France.  He was tried in 1944 and sentenced to death, but while awaiting execution he was kidnapped and murdered by French partisans.

References

External links
Charles Marion's profile at databaseOlympics

Sportspeople from Saint-Germain-en-Laye
1887 births
1944 deaths
École Spéciale Militaire de Saint-Cyr alumni
French dressage riders
Olympic equestrians of France
French male equestrians
Equestrians at the 1928 Summer Olympics
Equestrians at the 1932 Summer Olympics
Olympic gold medalists for France
Olympic silver medalists for France
Olympic medalists in equestrian
Medalists at the 1932 Summer Olympics
Medalists at the 1928 Summer Olympics
French military personnel of World War II
French generals
Prefects of France
People murdered in France
Assassinated French politicians
People of Vichy France
French politicians convicted of crimes
Executed French collaborators with Nazi Germany
Extrajudicial killings in World War II